Hoperius planatus is a species of beetle in the family Dytiscidae, the only species in the genus Hoperius.

References

Dytiscidae